Nehru Place is a Delhi Metro station in Delhi. It is located between Kailash Colony and Kalkaji Mandir stations on the Violet Line. The station was opened with the first section of the Line on 3 October 2010, in time for the 2010 Commonwealth Games opening ceremony on the same day. It caters to Nehru Place business centre, Kalkaji and Chittaranjan Park area. Yes Bank is also available to near this metro station.

Station layout

Facilities
Several ATMs are available at Nehru Place metro station.

Connections
Delhi Metro feeder bus service available to Malviya Nagar metro station situated on Yellow Line of Delhi Metro.

See also
List of Delhi Metro stations
Transport in Delhi
Delhi Metro Rail Corporation
Delhi Suburban Railway

References

External links

 Delhi Metro Rail Corporation Ltd. (Official site) 
 Delhi Metro Annual Reports
 
 UrbanRail.Net – descriptions of all metro systems in the world, each with a schematic map showing all stations.
Nehru Place Metro Station Route and Fare Info

Delhi Metro stations
Railway stations opened in 2010
Railway stations in South Delhi district